is an interchange railway station in the city of Fuji, Shizuoka Prefecture, Japan operated by Central Japan Railway Company (JR Tōkai).

Lines
It is also the southern terminus of the  Minobu Line. The station also is a freight terminal for the Japan Freight Railway Company.

Station layout
Fuji Station has three island platforms serving six tracks, which are connected each other a footbridge, which leads to station building, which is also constructed over the tracks. The station building has automated ticket machines, TOICA automated turnstiles and a staffed "Midori no Madoguchi" service counter.

Platforms

Adjacent stations

|-
!colspan=5|Central Japan Railway Company

History
In 1889, when the section of the Tōkaidō Main Line connecting Shizuoka with Kōzu was completed, stations were built at Suzukawa (Yoshiwara) and Iwabuchi (Fujikawa), with Kashima village in between without a train station. Due to the strong petition of the local residents, and political pressure applied by Oji Paper Company, who had established a paper mill nearby, a station was opened on April 21, 1909 and named “Fuji Station”. The terminus of the Minobu Line was established at Fuji Station on July 13, 1913. The station building was rebuilt in 1964. Container freight services began operations from 1994.

Station numbering was introduced in March 2018; Fuji Station was assigned station number CA09 for the Tōkaidō Line and CC00 for the Minobu Line.

Passenger statistics
In fiscal 2017, the station was used by an average of 9462 passengers daily (boarding passengers only).

See also
 List of Railway Stations in Japan

References

Yoshikawa, Fumio. Tokaido-sen 130-nen no ayumi. Grand-Prix Publishing (2002) .

External links

JR East Official home page.

Railway stations in Shizuoka Prefecture
Tōkaidō Main Line
Minobu Line
Railway stations in Japan opened in 1909
Stations of Central Japan Railway Company
Stations of Japan Freight Railway Company
Fuji, Shizuoka